William Garrat (born 21 April 1805) was an English professional cricketer who played first-class cricket from 1832 to 1845.

A right-handed batsman who was mainly associated with Nottingham and Nottinghamshire, he made 32 known appearances in first-class matches.  He represented the Players in the Gentlemen v Players series and the North in the North v. South series.

References

1805 births
English cricketers
English cricketers of 1826 to 1863
Players cricketers
Nottinghamshire cricketers
North v South cricketers
Year of death unknown
Nottingham Cricket Club cricketers
Fast v Slow cricketers